The 2006 Pitch and Putt World Cup was held in Teià (Catalonia) and was the second edition for this championship promoted by the Federation of International Pitch and Putt Associations (FIPPA), with 13 teams. Catalonia won the World Cup.

Qualifying round

League 9th-13th places

Final Rounds

Final standings

See also
Pitch and Putt World Cup

External links
 FIPPA Federation International of Pitch and Putt Associations
 2006 World Cup

Pitch and putt competitions
2006 in Catalan sport